The Boston University School of Social Work (SSW) is one of the sixteen graduate schools of Boston University. U.S. News & World Report has routinely ranked it among the top schools for social work in the United States.

Areas of study
BUSSW offers full and part-time programs leading to the Master of Social Work degree, with majors in Clinical and Macro Social Work Practice. Advanced Standing programs are also available.

The full-time study program includes two years of full-time study at Boston University's central Charles River campus. There are several part-time study programs, including an online program.  Typically part-time students fulfill the degree requirements in either three or four years.  Part-time students can attend the Charles River campus, one of four off-campus programs, or the online program.  The satellite campuses are located in Bedford, Massachusetts, Cape Cod, Massachusetts, Fall River, Massachusetts, and Worcester, Massachusetts, which offers an in-person/online hybrid program.

The School's curriculum emphasizes a broad approach to social and personal problems and the differential use of social work methods. During the first year of graduate study, the student is introduced to social work knowledge, values, and practice areas through a series of foundation courses.

Subsequently, students take advanced coursework to develop and deepen their competence according to their special interests and talents, and major in a method of social work: Clinical Social Work Practice (with individuals, families, and groups), or, for online and Charles River students, Macro Social Work Practice (community organization, management, and planning). In the last semester, students are required to take a social work practice ethics course.

Dual degree programs
BUSSW offers several Dual Degree programs in cooperation with other BU graduate schools and an interdisciplinary Ph.D. in Sociology and Social Work.

The School of Theology, the School of Education, and the School of Public Health have dual-degree programs with the School of Social Work.

The dual degree programs are as follows,

 a 3½ year course of study leading to both the Master of Social Work (MSW) and Master of Theological Studies,
 a 4½ year course of study leading to both the MSW and Master of Divinity (M.Div.),
 a course of study that leads to both the MSW and the Doctor of Ministry (D.Min.),
 a course of study  that lead to both the MSW and Master of Education (MEd) or Doctorate in Education (Ed.D.), and
 a 3-year course of study leading to both the Master of Social Work (MSW) and Master of Public Health (MPH).

History
The School had its beginnings in the School of Education and was later called the School of Religious and Social Work.

In 1937 the Division of Social Work inaugurated a two-year graduate program. In 1939 it was accredited provisionally as a school of social work, and in 1940 became a separate entity as the School of Social Work. Since 1942 it has offered only the graduate program, and since 1943 it has had full accreditation as a school of social work.

Accreditation
The School is fully accredited by the Council on Social Work Education and is authorized to award master's degrees in Social Work.

External links
Boston University School of Social Work website
Boston University School of Social Work On-Campus MSW Program
Boston University School of Social Work Online MSW Program
Boston University School of Social Work Off-Campus MSW Program
Boston University School of Social Work PhD Program

References

School of Social Work
Schools of social work in the United States
Educational institutions established in 1937
University subdivisions in Massachusetts
1937 establishments in Massachusetts